MGC Supa 8 is a football cup between the top 8 teams of the Lesotho Premier League. It is played in Lesotho.

See also 
 Football in Lesotho

References 

Football in Lesotho